Nahala (lit. Estate) is a moshav in south-central Israel. Located a few kilometers north of Kiryat Gat and south of Kiryat Malakhi., it falls under the jurisdiction of Yoav Regional Council.

History
The community was founded in 1953 by Yemeni Jewish refugees on land that had belonged to the depopulated Palestinian village of Summil. The founders had originally established moshav Agur in 1950. Along with the neighboring Menuha, it was named for the Menuha VeNahala organization that founded Rehovot.

See also
Nahala (disambiguation page), Hebrew word for heritage or estate widely used for toponyms in Israel

References

Moshavim
Populated places in Southern District (Israel)
Yemeni-Jewish culture in Israel
Populated places established in 1953
1953 establishments in Israel